Aluminium(I) oxide is a compound of aluminium and oxygen with the chemical formula Al2O. It can be prepared by heating the stable oxide Al2O3 with elemental silicon at 1800 °C under vacuum.

Formation and occurrence
Al2O commonly exists as a gas, since the solid state is not stable at room temperature and is only stable between 1050 and 1600 °C. Aluminium(I) oxide is formed by heating Al and Al2O3 in a vacuum while in the presence of SiO2 and C, and only by condensing the products. Information is not commonly available on this compound; it is unstable, has complex high-temperature spectra, and is difficult to detect and identify. In reduction, Al2O is a major component of vapors of Al2O3. There are also 12 valence electrons in Al2O. Al2O molecules can be detected by mass spectrometry, infrared emission, and ultraviolet absorption and emission in the gas phase. The molecule is linear at equilibrium in the ground state. In term of valence bond theory, these molecules can be described as adopting sp2 orbital hybridisation, featuring one sigma and two pi bonds. The corresponding ground state for the valence electrons is 1σ2 1σ*2 2σ2 1π4 1π*2, where the 1σ and 1σ* orbitals cancel, and the 1π and 1π* partially cancel. The overall configuration yields a divalent triplet molecule, with one lone electron focused on the oxygen atom and the other focused equally between the aluminium atoms.

Infrared measurements
Prominent absorptions are observed at 990.7 and 946.6 cm−1, which indicates the presence of a doublet. After diffusion absorptions are observed at 714.8 and 700 cm−1, which indicates a doublet and also at 689.4 cm−1, characteristics of a triplet system with two equivalent oxygen atoms. In a more concentrated matrix, both doublet and triplet systems are detected at 715 cm−1. However, after diffusion, the triplet system enhances and the double system decreases.
The diffusion implies that Al2O is an aggregate species, since it only appears in concentrated matrices, which may be due to polymerization. The triplet may be due to the presence of a dimer, (Al2O)2, however this should be viewed as relative, since the vapor pressure of Al2O is uncertain.

Uses
Aluminium as a metal fuel with oxidizers creates highly exothermic reactions. When Al2O3 is added to a pressure system, the reaction goes from steady, to accelerating, to unstable. This reaction indicates that unstable intermediates such as AlO or Al2O condense or do not form, which prevent acceleration and convection down the pressure system.

Aluminium oxides are used as a catalysts and are products of aluminium combustion. Organic peroxides of aluminium have explosive properties and can result in explosions with careless handling. An explosion of Octogen - Octahydro-1,3,5,7-tetranitro-1,3,5,7-tetrazocine (HMX) and aluminium produce aluminium oxide (Al2O3).

See also
Aluminium oxide
Aluminium(II) oxide
Oxide

References

Aluminium(I) compounds
Oxides